Marvel Animated Features (MAF) is a series of the first eight direct-to-video animated superhero films made by MLG Productions, a joint venture between Marvel Studios (later Marvel Animation) and Lions Gate Entertainment.

History
In 2004, Marvel Entertainment,  Marvel Comics' new parent corporation, struck a deal with Lions Gate Entertainment to produce a series of eight to ten direct-to-video animated movies under the name of Marvel Animated Features in conjunction with Marvel Studios, Marvel's direct film subsidiary.

The first two features, Ultimate Avengers: The Movie and Ultimate Avengers 2: Rise of the Panther, were released February 2006 and August 2006 respectively. As of November 2006, UA and UA2 combined had sold over 1.5 million units and both were in the top 10 children's releases for the year.

After the pair of Ultimate Avengers (UA) DVDs, the next MAF film, The Invincible Iron Man, was released in January 2007. As of January 2007, Doctor Strange: The Sorcerer Supreme was slated next for summer 2007 with the tentatively titled Teen Avengers under early development. The Invincible Iron Man and Doctor Strange: The Sorcerer Supreme features existed separately from the UA movie universe. A possible cross over or a third UA movie was hinted at being considered at that time. Originally, the MAF were being released two per year until Doctor Strange: The Sorcerer Supreme; while it was an Annie Awards nominee for "Best Home Entertainment Production" of 2007, it only sold half the number of DVD as either UA feature. After which, the MAFs releases were slowed to one per year.

Marvel Animation was incorporated in January 2008 to direct Marvel's efforts in animation and home entertainment markets, including Marvel Animation Features.

A proposed Ultimate War/Thor dual film DVD was passed over for the 2009 released Hulk vs. dual film DVD. Ultimate War would have adapted the Ultimate Marvel comic book of the same name, whilst the Thor movie would have selected Walt Simonson's "Thor" storyline (the original selection being a Beta Ray Bill story).

At the 2009 NATPE Conference, Lionsgate brought the eight Marvel Features to the TV market.

Most of the films have a PG-13 rating, but one of them has a PG rating.

Films

Ultimate Avengers: The Movie
Ultimate Avengers: The Movie is the first film in the Marvel Animated Features based loosely on the first six issues of the Ultimates by Mark Millar and Bryan Hitch. The film was released on February 21, 2006, and produced by DongWoo Animation. The movie focuses on Captain America, a super soldier who was frozen in ice for about 60 years after stopping a Nazi/extraterrestrial plot in 1945. The Captain is assigned to lead a team of heroes (also consisting of Iron Man, Thor, Giant-Man, Wasp, Black Widow, and Hulk), found by General Nick Fury of S.H.I.E.L.D, to fight the alien threat in the present.

Ultimate Avengers 2: Rise of the Panther
Ultimate Avengers 2: Rise of the Panther, is the second film in the series and a sequel to Ultimate Avengers: The Movie, produced by Dong Woo Animation. The film was released on August 8, 2006. In the film, the Black Panther teams up with the Ultimate Avengers to continue their fight against the aliens when they invade Africa.

Hawkeye, Quicksilver and Scarlet Witch were not in the initial Ultimate Avengers movie and were originally planned to be in the second movie. Using Hawkeye as an example, VP of Marvel Studios' Animation Development Craig Kyle did not want him to be a background character but "he's going to matter" if he appears.

The Invincible Iron Man
The Invincible Iron Man is the third film in the series and is based on the classic Marvel Universe version by Stan Lee and Jack Kirby. The film was produced by Starburst Entertainment and was released on January 23, 2007. Marc Worden returns as Tony Stark/Iron Man from the Ultimate Avengers films. In The Invincible Iron Man, Tony Stark, billionaire manufacturer, finds a lost Chinese city where he accidentally unleashes an evil powerful force. Stark creates his armor to become Iron Man and defeat the malevolent being.

Doctor Strange: The Sorcerer Supreme
Doctor Strange: The Sorcerer Supreme (with the on-screen title of Doctor Strange) is the fourth film in the series and is based on the character of the same name by Stan Lee and Steve Ditko, separate from the Ultimate Avengers universe. The film was released on August 14, 2007, and was nominated for "Best Home Entertainment Production" of 2007 for the 35th Annual Annie Awards. Doctor Strange: The Sorcerer Supreme tells the story of Dr. Stephen Strange, a bitter and arrogant neurosurgeon who falls victim to a car crash that injures the nerves in his hands, such that he can no longer perform surgery. Looking for a cure, he instead finds a different and higher pursuit as the new Sorcerer Supreme, the top master of the mystical arts.

Next Avengers: Heroes of Tomorrow

Next Avengers: Heroes of Tomorrow, tentatively titled Teen Avengers then Avengers Reborn, is the fifth movie in the Marvel Animated Features, and was released on September 2, 2008. Preliminary work had begun on "Teen Avengers" before January 18, 2007. By the release of its first look preview in August 2007, the title had changed to "Avengers Reborn". Fred Tatasciore repeats as the Hulk from the Ultimate Avengers movies. With the loss of their Avengers parents at the hands of Ultron and raised by billionaire bachelor Tony Stark/Iron Man, four orphaned teens, James Rogers (son of Captain America and Black Widow), Torunn (daughter of Thor and Sif), Henry Pym Jr. (son of Giant Man and Wasp), and Azari (son of Black Panther and Storm), must live up to their parents' legacy and defeat Ultron, the mechanical and maniacal foe that defeated them. Additional allies are recruited including Vision, the Hulk and Francis Barton (son of Hawkeye and Mockingbird).

Hulk vs.
Hulk vs. is a double feature film released on January 27, 2009, and the sixth in the series. The two features are Hulk vs. Thor and Hulk vs. Wolverine. In Hulk vs. Thor, Thor's villainous half-brother Loki teams up with the Enchantress in order to use the Hulk against him. However, separating Bruce Banner from his rampaging persona leads to a dire consequence in Asgard.  In Hulk vs. Wolverine, Logan is sent by the Canadian government to take care of the Hulk. However, they both get captured and must deal with a mysterious figure and his own mutant team.

The latter is based on The Incredible Hulk #181 by Roy Thomas, Len Wein and John Romita Sr. Hulk vs. was selected over a proposed Ultimate War/Thor double feature film. The film was produced by Madhouse. The DVD was originally called Hulk Smash, with an expected released date of October 2008. The double feature was released on DVD, Two-Disc Special Edition DVD, and Blu-ray.

Planet Hulk
Planet Hulk is the seventh film in the series. The movie was released on February 2, 2010 as a Two-Disc Special Edition DVD, Special Edition Blu-ray, Standard DVD, and Digital Download. It was the second film produced by Madhouse. The movie is based on the Planet Hulk story line in the comic book published in 2006–2007 by Greg Pak and Carlo Pagulayan. The Hulk was sent to a harsh planet where he is enslaved as he was weakened because of the travel through space. As a slave, he becomes a gladiator in a society ruled by the despotic Red King. After relying on his savage instincts, he becomes the leader of a gladiator group.

Cast and characters

Reception

Critical reaction

Marvel Ultimate Avengers: The Movie
Felix Vasquez Jr. of Cinema Crazed said, "It gave me what I wanted, in terms of entertainment, acting, animation, and sheer style…" Jeffrey M. Anderson of Common Sense Media called it an "average animated action tale [that] features troubled superheroes." David Cornelius of eFilmCritic.com said, "It's too violent for younger viewers, but not mature enough for older ones. It's a movie trapped in between target audiences."

Ultimate Avengers 2: Rise of the Black Panther
Felix Vasquez Jr. of Cinema Crazed said, "If this story doesn't widen its ideas, it's going to get much worse…" Jeffrey M. Anderson of Common Sense Media said, "[This] downbeat superhero story has less character, more violence." Marc Kandel of eFilmCritic.com said, "Turns out the sequel's just as bland as the first."

The Invincible Iron Man
David Cornelius of eFilmCritic.com said, "It's enough to tide fans over until the live action flick arrives." Todd Gilchrist of IGN said that "there are some great details that really bring this story to life," concluding that the film is "not quite invincible, but for a film about a guy made out of iron, it's pretty tough." Mike Pinsky of DVD Verdict said "the first act takes a very long time to get going," "the villains have no personality whatsoever," and "the art design and animation frame rate are really no better than the average television cartoon." Pinsky added that "there are some nice touches" and "the third act does generate some suspense," but concluded that "given all these obstacles, I don't know if even Iron Man could win this battle." Todd Douglass Jr. of DVD Talk said, "I enjoyed watching The Invincible Iron Man, but it didn't open any new doors for me as an Iron Man fan. From the start the story was pretty straightforward and predictable, though a few twists kept the adventure exciting along the way. Some of the character development also felt kind of forced to me with things simply happening for no reason other than to further the plot." Douglass concluded, "In the end, The Invincible Iron Man should be considered an achievement by comic book fans. The solid adventure features a lot of action and a rich comic book atmosphere that will leave you wanting more DVDs just like it."

Doctor Strange: The Sorcerer Supreme
Christopher Monfette of IGN said the film "plays out as expected" and has "[a] middle section [that] sags," but features "action sequences [that are] beautifully choreographed and emotionally resonant," and concluded that "strong animation, good acting, and resonant character work bring the icon to life." Adam Arseneau of DVD Verdict said the film "fails to live up to its narrative potential" and criticized the "rushed ending," but praised its "sharp animation" and described the DVD as a "solid rental." Nick Lyons of DVD Talk said that "the visuals are engaging," but criticized the film for "dramatically alter[ing]" the character, saying: "Instead of characterizing Stephen Strange as a cocky, personable, confident jackass like in the comic books he has been reduced to an emo wimp with a useless tacked-on backstory about the death of his sister. The lifeless voice work by Bryce Johnson doesn't help the character, either." Lyons concluded, "Comic book fans looking for a faithful adaptation of Dr. Strange will sadly be disappointed by this animated feature. For a superior Marvel animated movie, I'd advise checking out the first Ultimate Avengers. "

Next Avengers: Heroes of Tomorrow 
Felix Vasquez Jr. of Cinema Crazed said, "[This is] the antithesis of what should be done to grab new demographics." Nancy Davis Kho of Common Sense Media called it a "rollicking young superhero tale." David Cornelius of DVD Talk called it, "Another batch of lost opportunities for Marvel." Felix Gonzalez Jr. of DVD Review said, "With by-the-numbers characters and only a marginally interesting setup, however, even younger viewers may grow impatient as the film makes its way to a pretty good climax."

Hulk vs.

Hulk vs. Thor
Cindy White of IGN stated, "Rather than the wild, forest landscapes of Canada, this one deals with the stately architecture of Asgard, and there are a lot more characters. Being less familiar with Thor as a series, some of the shout-outs to the comics were lost on me, for the most part, but I'm sure Thor fans will appreciate them. Todd Douglass Jr. of DVD Talk said, "In Hulk vs. Thor the plot is a little more calculated and it feels balanced by comparison." and actually like the battles "One of the joys of Hulk vs. Thor was watching the monster tear his way across Odin's world. Nothing can stand in his way and there are many outstanding moments and fight scenes peppered throughout the film." Kerry Birmingham of DVD Verdict stated, "Kyle and Yost have less of an affinity for Thor, and it shows; their Thor script, despite its violence, lacks the glee of the Wolverine installment. In approaching Thor's Hulk as a raging counterpart to Wolverine's more reactive, childlike Hulk, the creators commendably draw a distinction between their interpretations of the character, but the Asgard throw down is simply less fun than its more gonzo counterpart."

Hulk vs. Wolverine
Cindy White of IGN said, "The benefits of a direct-to-DVD project like this is that the creators didn't have to shy away from the kind of gore that would be unacceptable for a Saturday-morning audience" commenting on how Wolverine uses his claws on a living entity and not just on robots as in other animated features. Todd Douglass Jr. of DVD Talk described it as fast-paced, but criticized the Weapon X backstory as "a bit out of place" and said it "also takes away from the Hulk versus Wolverine storyline." Kerry Birmingham of DVD Verdict stated, "The most immediately successful of the two is Wolverine, enlivened by a punchier script than its Norse cousin. Craig Kyle and Chris Yost, screenwriters for both episodes, are veteran comic book writers and well-versed in the world of the X-Men, and as such seem to have injected Wolverine with a bit more energy."

Planet Hulk
Felix Vasquez Jr. of Cinema Crazed said, "All in all strong voice work tops what is a truly entertaining installment from the Marvel animated film gallery." Rick Marshall of MTV said, "In the end, Planet Hulk is a fun film that should prove entertaining for mainstream audiences and fans of the character. Marvel Studios and Lionsgate are headed in the right direction with their animated features, and Planet Hulk feels like another step forward."

Thor: Tales of Asgard
Brian Costello of Common Sense Media criticized the film for its use of violence, drinking, and sexual innuendo. Cindy White of IGN gave it a 7.0 out of 10 stating, "When it comes to content made just for DVD, DC and Warner Bros. have consistently edged out Marvel with their series of original animated movies, in quality of storytelling as well as animation. There's nothing about Thor: Tales of Asgard that reverses that trend". Kofi Outlaw of Screen Rant said "All in all, Tales of Asgard is an enjoyable Thor adventure -- even with the titular character reduced to teen age. It's not necessarily one of those animated features you'll want to watch over and over again, but if you're a collector of every Marvel animated movie released, or are looking for an entertaining superhero adventure to rent, definitely check it out". James O'Ehley of Sci-Fi Movie Page said, "Don't judge this DVD by its cover: the movie might as well be called Young Thor or I Was a Teenaged Norse Deity."

Sales

References

External links
 Marvel Animation Movie Age – ToonZone.net's Marvel Animated Features website

 
Film series introduced in 2006
English-language films
American animated science fiction films
American animated action films
2000s animated films
Alien invasions in films
Animated film series